Delux is a pop rock band formed in Tijuana, Mexico, in the summer of 2000. The group is influenced by 1980s new wave music and the SoCal punk scene. Their 2005 debut self-titled record spawned three music videos which included an MTV VMA Nomination for Best New Artist. In 2007 they released Entre La Guerra y El Amor under major label (Sony/BMG) which allowed them to reach a more diverse and larger audience. In 2010, Delux released a bilingual album, which propelled them to be named one of the most influential Hispanic rock bands of the Internet era. They appeared on Alternative Presss 100 bands to watch in 2008.

Band members
 Mauricio Pérez – Guitar, vocals
 Leonardo Ramirez – Guitar, vocals
 Luis “Chocs” Campos – Drums

Discography
 Delux (2004)
 Entre la Guerra y el Amor (2007)
 $ (2010)
 Descontrol (2019)

Singles
 "Más de lo que te Imaginas"
 "Chat Noir" (video featuring live concert clips)
 "Apague el Sol"
 "Entre la Guerra y el Amor"
 "Dime"
 "Quien Comparte tu Silencio"
 "Get the Money" (animated video)
 "Hey Lover"
 "Alarma!"
 "To live and die in TJ"
 "Infatuacion" (filmed live at House of Blues sunset strip U.S.A.)
 "Tu Piel"
 "Lentamente"

External links
 Delux on MySpace

Musical groups from Tijuana
Mexican rock music groups
Musical groups established in 2000
2000 establishments in Mexico